Mohabbat is a 1985 Indian Hindi-language romantic drama film directed by Bapu. The film stars Anil Kapoor and Vijayta Pandit. It is a remake of the 1982 Tamil film Thooral Ninnu Pochchu.

Plot 

Shekhar is in love with Roopa and would like to marry her. Roopa is the only daughter of Choudhury, the apple of his eye, and he agrees to get her married to Shekhar. Shekhar informs his parents, his dad, and his stepmother, and together they all go to Choudhury's house to finalize the marriage. At this point, Shekhar's stepmother asks for a hefty sum as dowry, which the Choudhury is unable to afford, and thus the proposal for marriage falls flat, with the Choudhury vowing that he will get his daughter married elsewhere. Shekhar is disgusted with his stepmother, and leaves home and comes to Choudhury and attempts to convince him to reconsider, but Choudhury is adamant, and goes ahead to plan his daughter's marriage with Atmaram, leaving both Shekar and Roopa devastated, and unsure what plan of action to adopt.

Cast 

 Anil Kapoor as Shekhar
 Vijayta Pandit as Roopa Chaudhary
 Shakti Kapoor as Atmaram
 Aruna Irani as Shakuntala Chaudhury
 Amrish Puri as Chaudhary
 Amjad Khan as Gama Pehalwan
 Shammi as Chaudhary's Mother
 Shubha Khote as Shekhar's Stepmother
 Ram Mohan as Shekhar's Father
Satish Kaushik as Monto
Sunder as Pandit 
Huma Khan as Gama Pahelwan dead wife

Production 
The producer Indra Kumar initially wanted to make a film inspired by Teesri Manzil (1966), with Anil Kapoor starring. Kapoor refused the offer and instead suggested remaking the Tamil film Thooral Ninnu Pochchu (1982); this led to the creation of Mohabbat.

Soundtrack 
The music is composed by Bappi Lahiri with lyrics penned by Indeevar.

References

External links 

1980s Hindi-language films
1985 films
1985 romantic drama films
Films directed by Bapu
Films scored by Bappi Lahiri
Indian romantic drama films